A referendum was held on 25 September 2022 in Cuba to approve amendments to the family code of the Cuban Constitution. The referendum passed, legalizing same-sex marriage, same-sex adoption, and altruistic surrogacy, among other rights. Following the referendum, Cuba's family policies have been described as among the most progressive in Latin America.

Background 
Until 2019, Article 36 of the Constitution of Cuba (most recently amended in 1992) defined marriage as "the voluntary union established between a man and a woman". As such, the wording constitutionally prohibited same-sex marriage.

In December 2017, LGBT groups launched a public campaign to repeal the constitutional ban. On 4 May 2018, Mariela Castro said that she would propose a reform of the constitution and introduce a complementary measure to legalize same-sex marriage, since the constitutional reform process was expected to begin in July 2018. On 21 July, the Council of State, Homero Acosta Álvarez, said that the draft constitution included a provision that defined marriage as a "union between two people". The National Assembly approved the draft on 22 July, and it was subject to public consultation between 13 August and 15 November 2018. 

The issue of same-sex marriage triggered public debate and organization in Cuba. In June 2018, five Christian denominations declared same-sex marriage "contrary to the spirit of the communist revolution". In what was described as "a poster war", both opponents and supporters of same-sex marriage put up hundreds of posters around Havana. In September 2018, after conservative opposition to the proposal to legalize same-sex marriage, President of Cuba and First Secretary of the Communist Party of Cuba, Miguel Díaz-Canel, announced his support for same-sex marriage. In his first interview since taking office in April, he told Telesur that he supports "marriage between people without any restrictions", and is in favor of "eliminating any kind of discrimination in society".

On 18 December, the constitutional commission removed the definition of marriage from the bill. Instead, the commission chose to use neutral language and define marriage as a "social and legal institution" without reference to the gender of the parties. This meant that the new constitution would not explicity legalize same-sex marriage, but at the same time the ban on same-sex marriage would be repealed.​ Mariela Castro said that same-sex marriage would instead be legalized through a change in the Family Code. 

The new constitution was approved in a referendum on 24 February 2019, with 90.6% in favor, and entered into force on 10 April of the same year. Article 82 of the new constitution states:

Preparations 

On 15 September 2021, the Cuban government published the draft of the new Family Code, which would legalize same-sex marriage. Article 61 of the draft code states that marriage is "the consensual union between two people" without specifying the sex of the couple. Likewise, parents are no longer defined by their sex, since Articles 30 and 31 allow same-sex adoption and explicitly grant the right of paternity to couples who use the various forms of assisted reproductive technology. The new code was well received by LGBT rights associations, although they remained cautious about the success of the changes. On 30 December 2021, a special commission was created to organize the referendum, headed by the diplomat Antonio Machín.

Subject to a popular consultation period from 15 February 2022, the project was criticized by some pro-LGBT activists, who argued that a fundamental right should not need to be put to a referendum. The government responded that it preferred to implement the changes to the law in a way that was accepted by the public, rather than being imposed by force. The referendum process is also taking place against the backdrop of a wave of same-sex marriage legalization in the rest of Latin America, adding to frustrations among Cuba's LGBT community regarding the slow pace of change compared to nearby jurisdictions.

In addition to LGBT issues, the new Family Code also includes greater protection for children and adolescents, the co-responsibility of parents in their education, and strict equality of rights between men and women. The Code also guarantees minors the right not to be the object of exclusion, violence or parental neglect.

On 6 June 2022, version 25 of the Family Code was presented, reflecting the final results of the public consultation and including modifications to 48.73% of the articles.

Opinion polls

Results 
The vote commenced for Cuban nationals abroad on 18 September at around 1,000 polling stations worldwide, including at Cuban embassies and consulates, and voting commenced in Cuba itself at 07:00 CDT on 25 September.. Polls closed in most of the country at 18:00, though voters in line at polling locations at that time were reportedly allowed to vote. Certain locations in Havana and Santiago de Cuba were allowed to stay open until 20:00 due to rains from the 2022 Atlantic hurricane season. The results were set to be released on 30 September by the National Electoral Council. However, preliminary exit polls showed that a majority of voters supported the proposals. The abstention rate of the referendum was 26%, higher than the abstention rate for the constitutional referendums of 1976 and 2019.

By province and equivalents

Notes

See also 
 Recognition of same-sex unions in the Americas
 Same-sex marriage in Cuba
 LGBT rights in Cuba

References

Family Code referendum
Cuba
Cuba
LGBT rights in Cuba
Referendums in Cuba
Same-sex marriage referendums
Cuba
LGBT-related legislation